Paolo Rosario De Stefano (born December 21, 1976 in Melito di Porto Salvo) is an Italian mobster and member of the 'Ndrangheta. He has been a fugitive since 2005 and was included on the list of most wanted fugitives in Italy. He is indicted for Mafia association, robbery and extortion.

He belongs to the De Stefano 'ndrina and is the son of the clan's boss, Giorgio De Stefano, who was killed in 1977. In 2007 he was convicted to eight years and four months in prison. 

After the arrest in December 2008 of his cousin Giuseppe De Stefano he was next in line to be the boss of the clan.

He was arrested on August 18, 2009, while on holiday with his family at the popular tourist town of Taormina in Sicily.

References

External links
 Most wanted list of the Italian ministry of the Interior

1976 births
De Stefano 'ndrina
'Ndranghetisti
People from the Province of Reggio Calabria
Living people